Inspiration4 (stylized as Inspirati④n) was a 2021 human spaceflight operated by SpaceX on behalf of Shift4 Payments CEO Jared Isaacman. The mission launched the Crew Dragon Resilience on 16 September 2021 at 00:02:56 UTC from Kennedy Space Center's Launch Complex 39A atop a Falcon 9 launch vehicle. It placed the Dragon capsule into low Earth orbit, and the mission ended on 18 September 2021 at 23:06:49 UTC, when Resilience splashed down in the Atlantic Ocean.

The trip was the first orbital spaceflight with only private citizens aboard and was part of a charitable effort on behalf of St. Jude's in Memphis, Tennessee.  Isaacman was named mission commander. The hospital selected two commercial astronauts: Hayley Arceneaux and Christopher Sembroski. Shift4 selected Sian Proctor who was named pilot.

It concluded with the first crewed splashdown in the Atlantic Ocean since Apollo 9 in 1969.

Trip and crew 

Inspiration4 was the first human spaceflight to orbit Earth with only private citizens on board. The trip promoted and raised money for St. Jude Children's Research Hospital. The crew and trip intended to raise upwards of US$100 million to expand St. Jude's childhood cancer research. Isaacman and his wife, Monica, personally donated US$125 million to the hospital, and contributions by SpaceX founder Elon Musk (US$55 million) and many others ultimately raised the total given to St. Jude to more than US$243 million, far more than initial target amount.

Inspiration4 was led by Shift4 Payments CEO Jared Isaacman, an experienced pilot with qualification in military jets. Isaacman procured the flight and its four seats from SpaceX and donated two of the seats to St. Jude. Hayley Arceneaux, a physician assistant at the hospital and a survivor of bone cancer, was selected by the hospital to board the flight. St. Jude raffled the second seat as part of a successful campaign to raise US$200 million for the hospital, termed St. Jude Mission: Inspired. A raffle draw competition was held, in which entrants needed to be a US citizen and had to donate a significant amount of money between US$10 to US$10,000. Kyle Hippchen, from Embry–Riddle Aeronautical University, donated US$600 and ultimately won the raffle but decided to give the seat to his friend, U.S. Air Force veteran Christopher Sembroski, who had also entered the raffle by donating US$50, due to being over the allowed weight limit. Entrepreneur Sian Proctor was selected by Shift4 Payments to board the flight through a competition modeled after Shark Tank that rewarded the best business idea to make use of Shift4's commerce solutions. The panelists in the competition included Salesforce CEO Marc Benioff, Fast Company editor Stephanie Mehta, former NASA engineer Mark Rober and Bar Rescue host Jon Taffer.

Resilience was the first spacecraft to orbit with an all-rookie crew since Shenzhou 7 in 2008. The last time NASA launched an all-rookie orbital crew was STS-2 in 1981.

All four received commercial astronaut training by SpaceX. The training included lessons in orbital mechanics, operating in a microgravity environment, stress testing, emergency-preparedness training and mission simulations. Afterwards, on 25 September 2021, CNN reported that an alarm had sounded during the journey, and was found to be associated with an apparent toilet malfunction.

Spacecraft 

The Inspiration4 mission was the second flight of Resilience, following its use for Crew-1. It also marked the fourth crewed flight of a Crew Dragon. The spacecraft's docking adapter, normally used to dock with the International Space Station, was replaced for this mission by a single monolithic multi-layer domed plexiglass window inspired by the Cupola module, allowing 360° views outside Resiliences nose from space. The cupola was protected during launch and re-entry by the spacecraft's retractable nosecone, which also housed a custom camera enabling photography of the vehicle's interior and exterior during flight. The cupola is removable so that Resilience can easily be reconfigured for missions in the future that require docking. Four Draco thrusters located on the spacecraft's nose necessitated the installation of four heat shield tiles on the cupola's exterior, which protected the plexiglass dome from engine exhaust during propulsive maneuvers.

Flight 

Resilience launched on 16 September 2021 at 00:02:56 UTC (15 September 2021 at 20:02:56 EDT) atop Falcon 9 Block 5 booster B1062 from Kennedy Space Center's Launch Complex 39A. It was the third flight of this booster. The spacecraft was launched into an inclination of 51.6°. With Resilience in orbit, three Dragon spacecraft were simultaneously orbiting Earth, as Endeavour flies the Crew-2 mission and C208 flies the CRS-23 mission. Inspiration4 was the first crewed orbital spaceflight since STS-125 in 2009 to not visit a space station.

Each crew member was assigned an individual call sign for communications. Isaacman's call sign was "Rook", Proctor's was "Leo", Arceneaux's was "Nova" and Sembroski's was "Hanks."

As the second stage engine of SpaceX's Falcon 9 rocket cut off, Arceneaux reached into a pouch strapped to her leg and pulled out a plush toy dog that represents the therapy dogs employed by St. Jude. The toy, attached to a tether, began to float above Arceneaux's head and in doing so fulfilled its purpose as the Inspiration4 mission's "zero-g indicator". Hanging in the air, it provided a visual signal to Arceneaux and her three crewmates that they were now in the microgravity environment of outer space after reaching Earth orbit on 16 September 2021.

The mission planned to include ultrasounds, microbe samples and a variety of in-flight health experiments (measure fluid shifts, record ECG activity, blood oxygen levels, heart rates, etc.) on the human bodies of ordinary citizens who have not been previously carefully screened and exhaustively trained as professional astronauts. The study of the effects of spaceflight on human health and performance was done in collaboration with SpaceX, the Translational Research Institute for Space Health (TRISH) at Baylor College of Medicine and investigators at Weill Cornell Medicine. During the journey, an alarm had sounded, and was found to be associated with an apparent toilet malfunction.

On 18 September 2021, at 23:06:49 UTC, Resilience splashed down in the Atlantic Ocean north of Cape Canaveral and was picked up by recovery ship GO Searcher roughly forty minutes afterward. Arceneaux was first to exit the spacecraft, followed by Proctor, Sembroski and Isaacman.

Orbital altitude 

Achieving this altitude exposed the craft and crew to different radiation levels than those found on the International Space Station. The investigation of the effects of spaceflight on human health and performance was done in collaboration with SpaceX, the Translational Research Institute for Space Health (TRISH) at Baylor College of Medicine, and investigators at Weill Cornell Medicine.

 Media coverage 
Media coverage of the mission has been widely positive, noting its charitable focus, duration and altitude achieved. The mission was documented as it happened in a five-episode docuseries entitled Countdown: Inspiration4 Mission to Space'', released on the subscription streaming service Netflix in September 2021.

See also 

 Space tourism
 Axiom Mission 1
 Space Adventures Crew Dragon mission
 Polaris program
 List of fully civilian crewed orbital spaceflights

Notes

References

External links 

 
 Countdown: Inspiration4 Mission to Space (Netflix documentary)

 
2021 in the United States
Orbital space tourism missions
Spacecraft launched in 2021
SpaceX Dragon 2
SpaceX human spaceflights
Spacecraft which reentered in 2021
Space tourists
Fully civilian crewed orbital spaceflights